George Herbert (23 January 1892 – 16 June 1982) was a British Conservative Party politician. He was elected as the Member of Parliament (MP) for Rotherham at the 1931 general election, and resigned on 6 February 1933 by appointment as Steward of the Chiltern Hundreds.

References

External links 
 

1892 births
1982 deaths
Conservative Party (UK) MPs for English constituencies
UK MPs 1931–1935